Master Harold...and the Boys is a 2010 American drama film which is based on the original theatre play of the same name by Athol Fugard, directed by director Lonny Price.  The cast includes Freddie Highmore and Ving Rhames.

Plot
Set in Port Elizabeth, South Africa, during the early apartheid days. The story deals with the coming of age of seventeen-year-old Hally (played by Freddie Highmore). Hally, a white South African, has a bad relationship with his biological father and is torn between his father's expectations and opinions of him and those of his surrogate fathers, black waiters named Sam (played by Ving Rhames) and Willie (played by Patrick Mofokeng). Young Hally is obliged to laugh at his father's racist jokes and perform humiliating tasks like empty chamber pots. By contrast, Sam exposes Hally to many positive experiences. After being humiliated by his father, Sam shows Hally how to be proud of something he's achieved by helping him build and fly his own kite.

One day, Hally receives news that his real father, a violent alcoholic, is coming back home from a long stint in a hospital. Hally, distraught with this news, unleashes years of anger and pain on his two black friends.

Production
Master Harold and the Boys began filming in and around Cape Town, South Africa in mid-January, 2009 over a five-week period. It is one of the first feature films in South Africa to be shot with the red camera format. This film has a budget of just under $3m. Apart from its two international actors (Freddie Highmore & Ving Rhames), Nugent and American director Lonny Price, this film is a fully South African film. Waterfront Post will post-produce this film, with Spier Films owning copyright. All the HOD's (Head of Department) are South African, including Director of Photography  Lance Gewer from the Oscar-winning Tsotsi, editor Ronelle Loots, production designer Tom Gubb and Pierre Viennings (wardrobe). Philip Miller is composing the music.

DVD / Blu-ray release
Master Harold and the Boys was released in the United States on July 5, 2011 to DVD and Blu-ray.

References

External links

2010 films
2010 drama films
Films set in the 1950s
Films set in South Africa
American films based on plays
American drama films
English-language South African films
Film controversies
Film controversies in South Africa
Race-related controversies in film
2010s English-language films
2010s American films